The 1926 Georgetown Blue and Gray football team represented Georgetown University during the 1926 college football season.  Led by Lou Little in his third season as head coach, the team went 7–2–1.

Schedule

References

Georgetown
Georgetown Hoyas football seasons
Georgetown Blue and Gray football